Claire van der Boom (born 1983) is an Australian actress. She first became known to Australian audiences for her roles in the TV series Love My Way and East West 101. In 2008, she starred in the Australian neo-noir thriller The Square. Internationally, she is best known for her appearance as Stella Karamanlis in the HBO miniseries The Pacific, and her recurring role playing the ex-wife of Det. Danny Williams in the 2010 remake of Hawaii Five-O.

Biography
Van der Boom was born in Broome, Western Australia. She attended Presbyterian Ladies' College in Perth, where she studied drama, graduating in 1999. She graduated from the National Institute of Dramatic Art (NIDA) in 2005.

Acting career
Following graduation, van der Boom appeared in the Australian TV series Love My Way and East West 101. Her first major role in a feature film was in The Square, opposite Joel Edgerton and directed by Nash Edgerton. It premiered at the Sydney Film Festival in June 2008. It was released in the US in 2010 by Apparition.

Van der Boom had a role in the Steven Spielberg-produced mini-series The Pacific. This 10-part series, which is a follow-up to Band of Brothers, was largely filmed in Australia and was released internationally in March 2010. The role of Stella required her to speak Greek.

In 2008, van der Boom appeared as Grace Barry in the Australian police drama Rush, but her character was killed off in episode 11, which aired 11 November 2008. Josef Ber's character, Sergeant Dominic "Dom" Wales, was originally scripted to be killed off. However, during production of the first season, van der Boom had her US green card approved which required her to relocate. She was nominated for a TV week Silver Logie for her work.

Van der Boom starred in the 2010 psychological thriller Red Hill, opposite Ryan Kwanten and directed by Patrick Hughes. Also in 2010 she starred in the comedic LGBT short 'Baby Cake' which screened at multiple festivals. In 2010, she portrayed Sister Berenice Twohill in the telemovie Sisters of War, directed by Brendan Maher, for which she won a Logie Award for Most Outstanding Actress in 2011.

Van der Boom starred in the 2011 telemovie Underbelly Files: The Man Who Got Away, the true story of drug smuggler David McMillan. She played McMillan's lover Clelia Vigano. She played the role of reporter Juliette Gardner in the first three episodes of the Australian police procedural City Homicide; the episodes aired in February and March 2011. She portrays the ex-wife of Danny Williams (Scott Caan) in the remake Hawaii Five-0 series.

In 2012, van der Boom was cast in two Off-Broadway productions. She played 'Karen' in David Rabe's An Early History of Fire (The New Group) and took over the role of 'Sally' (originally played by Julianne Nicholson) in the extended season of Sam Shepard's Heartless (Signature Theatre). Van der Boom had previously worked with Shepard in Tough Trade, the original series pilot for Epix. She played Billie Tucker in the drama.

Van der Boom appeared in the 2015 film 5 Flights Up, starring Morgan Freeman and Diane Keaton, playing 'Young Ruth' to Keaton's 'Ruth'. In November 2014, Universal Pictures secured the international distribution rights to the Australian feature Love Is Now, starring van der Boom, Eamon Farren and Anna Torv. In 2015 she appeared in Stephen Suettinger's movie, A Year and Change as Vera.

In 2015, van der Boom appeared in Chronic, which won the Best Screenplay Award at the 2015 Cannes Film Festival. The same year, she was in the premiere of Scott Caan's play The Trouble With Where We Come From at The Falcon Theatre in Los Angeles.

In 2015, van der Boom appeared in the movie Broke, as Terri , the film directed by Heath Davis who along with Luke Graham and Carmel Leonard produced the film.

In 2016, she appeared in the coming-of-age film Dear Eleanor. She appeared in the two episodes of Constantine, portraying the character of Anne-Marie who has secluded herself away from society in the guise of a Catholic nun in Mexico, as a result of the Newcastle incident. She was a series regular in the ten-part NBC series Game of Silence. Van der Boom also played Phyllis in the theatre adaptation of the crime novel Double Indemnity for the Melbourne Theatre Company.

In 2017, van der Boom starred in the romantic drama film Battlecreek, directed by Alison Eastwood.

Music career
In 2003, van der Boom recorded vocals for a track titled "Do What You Want" produced by Jason Hearn. The track was later remixed by Infusion, Max Graham and Jacob Todd. The Infusion remix is featured on the critically acclaimed Balance 005 compilation mixed by James Holden. The Max Graham Afterhours In Montreal Mix is included on DJ Tiësto's 2005 album In Search of Sunrise 4: Latin America.

Filmography

Film

Television

References

External links 

1983 births
21st-century Australian actresses
Actresses from Western Australia
Australian expatriate actresses in the United States
Australian film actresses
Australian people of Dutch descent
Australian television actresses
Living people
Logie Award winners
National Institute of Dramatic Art alumni
People from Broome, Western Australia